Catherine Owen is a Canadian poet, writer, and performer.

Early Life
Catherine Owen was born and raised in Vancouver and is the eldest of five. She began writing at three and published a short story in a Catholic Schools writing contest chapbook at the age of 11. She did her first public poetry readings in her teens and Exile Editions published her poetry in 1998. Since then, she’s released fifteen collections of poetry and prose, including essays, memoirs, short fiction and children’s books. She now lives in Edmonton.

Education 
Owen has a Masters degree in English Literature.

Career

Owen's work has been reviewed by Quill and Quire, Urban Graffiti, The Bull Calf Review, Canadian Literature: A Quarterly of Criticism and Review.  She has edited a collection of interviews and writing practices known as The Other 23 and a Half Hours or Everything You Wanted To Know That Your MFA Didn't Teach You (Wolsak & Wynn, 2015). She has a compilation of short stories/sliver fictions called The Day of the Dead, published by Caitlin Press in 2016. In 2020, Wolsak and Wynn released her anthology of grief memoirs by 24 Canadian writers titled Locations of Grief: an emotional geography. Her reviews of poetry books can be found on Marrow Reviews, Canadian Literature, The Malahat and CNQ. 

As a musician she has released CDs with the metal bands Inhuman and Helgrind and a vinyl through her solo project Grieve. She has also performed three one woman plays, collaborates with multi-media artists and runs the performance series 94th Street Trobairitz, as well as hosting a podcast named Ms Lyric's Poetry Outlaws and a kidlit YouTube channel named The Reading Queen.

Awards 
 Stephan G. Stephansson Award for Poetry in 2010.
 Nominated for the Gerald Lampert Award (1999) and the BC Book Prize (2002), along with the George Ryga Award, the Re-lit Prize (2006, 2018) and the Pat Lowther Award (2018). Individual poems have been shortlisted for the CBC Award, the Earle Birney Prize and ARC's Poem of the Year.
 She has been the subject for the academic paper entitled Catherine Owen’s “Dodo” as Animal Rights Theory by Terry Trowbridge, published in Ariel: A Review of International English Literature from the University of Calgary, and another essay, Catherine Owen's "Severance Package" and the Limits of Ecological History also by Trowbridge, published in Rampike from the University of Windsor.

Bibliography 
 Locations of Grief: An Emotional Geography (2020) from Wolsak & Wynn 
 Riven (2020) from ECW Press
 Dear Ghost (2017) from Buckrider Books 
 The Day of the Dead (2016) from Caitlin Press
 The Other 23 & a Half Hours: Or Everything You Wanted to Know that Your MFA Didn’t Teach You (2015) from Wolsak and Wynn
 Designated Mourner (2014) from ECW Press
 Trobairitz (2012) from Anvil Press
 Catalysts: Confrontations with the muse (2012) from Wolsak and Wynn
 Seeing Lessons (2010) from Wolsak and Wynn. 
 Frenzy (2009) from Anvil Press
 Dog (2008) from Mansfield Press
 Fyre (2007) from Above Ground Press
 Shall: Ghazals (2006) from Wolsak and Wynn
 Cusp/Detritus: An Experiment in Alleyways (2006) from Anvil Press
 The Wrecks of Eden (2002) from Wolsak and Wynn
Somatic: The Life & Work of Egon Schiele (1998) from Exile Editions.

References

Year of birth missing (living people)
Living people
21st-century Canadian poets
Canadian women poets
Simon Fraser University alumni